Andy Greer (born August 6, 1962) is an American professional basketball coach who serves as assistant coach for the New York Knicks of the National Basketball Association (NBA). He was formerly an assistant for the Minnesota Timberwolves, in charge of their defense. He was the head coach of the U.S. Merchant Marine Academy from 1993 to 1997 and served as interim head coach for the Northern Illinois University during the second half of the 2000–01 season.

Coaching career
On June 29, 2015, he was hired to serve as an assistant coach by the Toronto Raptors. He joined the Minnesota Timberwolves as an assistant coach on September 25, 2016. On January 6, 2019, he was relieved of his duties together with head coach Tom Thibodeau. On September 4, 2020, Greer was hired as an assistant coach for the New York Knicks under head coach Tom Thibodeau.

Head coaching record

Personal life
Greer's younger brother, Larry, serves as an assistant coach for the New York Knicks.
Andy (and Larry) attended Camp Delaware, a high end sleep away summer camp in Winsted, Connecticut for many years as young adults in the early 1980s.

References

External links
 NBA coach profile
 Kauffman sports profile

1962 births
Living people
American men's basketball coaches
American men's basketball players
Boston University Terriers men's basketball coaches
Brandeis Judges men's basketball coaches
Brockport Golden Eagles men's basketball players
Chicago Bulls assistant coaches
College men's basketball head coaches in the United States
Houston Rockets assistant coaches
Junior college men's basketball coaches in the United States
Mansfield University of Pennsylvania alumni
Memphis Grizzlies assistant coaches
Merchant Marine Mariners men's basketball coaches
New York Knicks assistant coaches
Northern Illinois Huskies men's basketball coaches
USC Trojans men's basketball coaches